Karenanne Gussgard (born 2 January 1940) is a retired Norwegian judge.

She was born in Sandefjord in 1940. She studied law and earned her cand.jur. degree in 1964. She worked as a lawyer in Bergen from 1974, secretary in the Appeals Selection Committee of the Supreme Court of Norway from 1977, judge in Oslo City Court from 1983 and as a Supreme Court Justice from 1990 to her retirement in 2010.

References

1940 births
Living people
Supreme Court of Norway justices
20th-century Norwegian judges
People from Sandefjord
Norwegian women judges
21st-century Norwegian judges
20th-century women judges
21st-century women judges